The New Castle is a ruined castle at the mouth of the Shimna River in Newcastle, County Down, Northern Ireland. The original castle is mentioned as early as 1433 and was built to guard a ford across the river. The castle was rebuilt in 1588 by Felix Magenis. It was demolished in 1830.

References

Castles in County Down
Buildings and structures completed in 1433
Ruined castles in Northern Ireland
Buildings and structures demolished in 1830
Demolished buildings and structures in Northern Ireland
Newcastle, County Down